The 1951 Ohio State Buckeyes baseball team represented the Ohio State University in the 1951 NCAA baseball season. The head coach was Marty Karow, serving his 1st year.

The Buckeyes lost in the College World Series, defeated by the Texas A&M Aggies.

Roster

Schedule 

! style="" | Regular Season
|- valign="top" 

|- align="center" bgcolor="#ccffcc"
| 1 || March 16 || at  || Unknown • San Antonio, Texas || 15–3 || 1–0 || 0–0
|- align="center" bgcolor="#ffcccc"
| 2 || March 17 || at B. A. M. C. || Unknown • San Antonio, Texas || 7–8 || 1–1 || 0–0
|- align="center" bgcolor="#ffcccc"
| 3 || March 19 || at  || Clark Field • Austin, Texas || 0–8 || 1–2 || 0–0
|- align="center" bgcolor="#ffcccc"
| 4 || March 20 || at Texas || Clark Field • Austin, Texas || 3–4 || 1–3 || 0–0
|- align="center" bgcolor="#ccffcc"
| 5 || March 21 || at  || Unknown • Houston, Texas || 14–6 || 2–3 || 0–0
|- align="center" bgcolor="#ffcccc"
| 6 || March 22 || at Rice || Unknown • Houston, Texas || 2–3 || 2–4 || 0–0
|- align="center" bgcolor="#ccffcc"
| 7 || March 23 || at  || Unknown • Fort Worth, Texas || 4–2 || 3–4 || 0–0
|- align="center" bgcolor="#ccffcc"
| 8 || March 24 || at TCU || Unknown • Fort Worth, Texas || 7–3 || 4–4 || 0–0
|- align="center" bgcolor="#ccffcc"
| 9 || March 24 || at  || Unknown • St. Louis, Missouri || 10–4 || 5–4 || 0–0
|-

|- align="center" bgcolor="#ccffcc"
| 10 || April 6 ||  || Varsity Diamond • Columbus, Ohio || 2–0 || 6–4 || 0–0
|- align="center" bgcolor="#ccffcc"
| 11 || April 7 ||  || Varsity Diamond • Columbus, Ohio || 15–1 || 7–4 || 0–0
|- align="center" bgcolor="#ffcccc"
| 12 || April 14 ||  || Varsity Diamond • Columbus, Ohio || 0–1 || 7–5 || 0–0
|- align="center" bgcolor="#ccffcc"
| 13 || April 20 ||  || Varsity Diamond • Columbus, Ohio || 10–9 || 8–5 || 1–0
|- align="center" bgcolor="#ccffcc"
| 14 || April 21 || Minnesota || Varsity Diamond • Columbus, Ohio || 7–0 || 9–5 || 2–0
|- align="center" bgcolor="#ffcccc"
| 15 || April 24 || at  || Unknown • Oxford, Ohio || 3–4 || 9–6 || 2–0
|- align="center" bgcolor="#ffcccc"
| 16 || April 27 || at  || Hyames Field • Kalamazoo, Michigan || 2–3 || 9–7 || 2–0
|- align="center" bgcolor="#ffcccc"
| 17 || April 28 || at Western Michigan || Hyames Field • Kalamazoo, Michigan || 5–7 || 9–8 || 2–0
|-

|- align="center" bgcolor="#ccffcc"
| 18 || May 1 || at  || Unknown • Athens, Ohio || 7–6 || 10–8 || 2–0
|- align="center" bgcolor="#ccffcc"
| 19 || May 4 ||  || Varsity Diamond • Columbus, Ohio || 12–6 || 11–8 || 3–0
|- align="center" bgcolor="#ccffcc"
| 20 || May 5 || Purdue || Varsity Diamond • Columbus, Ohio || 14–4 || 12–8 || 4–0
|- align="center" bgcolor="#ffcccc"
| 21 || May 8 ||  || Varsity Diamond • Columbus, Ohio || 6–8 || 12–9 || 4–0
|- align="center" bgcolor="#ccffcc"
| 22 || May 9 || at Dayton || Unknown • Dayton, Ohio || 11–2 || 13–9 || 4–0
|- align="center" bgcolor="#ccffcc"
| 23 || May 12 ||  || Varsity Diamond • Columbus, Ohio || 6–5 || 14–9 || 5–0
|- align="center" bgcolor="#ccffcc"
| 24 || May 12 || Indiana || Varsity Diamond • Columbus, Ohio || 5–2 || 15–9 || 6–0
|- align="center" bgcolor="#ccffcc"
| 25 || May 15 || Ohio || Varsity Diamond • Columbus, Ohio || 6–0 || 16–9 || 6–0
|- align="center" bgcolor="#ffcccc"
| 26 || May 18 || at  || Northwestern Park • Evanston, Illinois || 1–3 || 16–10 || 6–1
|- align="center" bgcolor="#ccffcc"
| 27 || May 19 || at Northwestern || Northwestern Park • Evanston, Illinois || 10–3 || 17–10 || 7–1
|- align="center" bgcolor="#ccffcc"
| 28 || May 22 || at Cincinnati || Carson Field • Cincinnati, Ohio || 8–4 || 18–10 || 7–1
|- align="center" bgcolor="#ccffcc"
| 29 || May 25 ||  || Varsity Diamond • Columbus, Ohio || 4–1 || 19–10 || 8–1
|- align="center" bgcolor="#ffcccc"
| 30 || May 25 || Michigan || Varsity Diamond • Columbus, Ohio || 3–6 || 19–11 || 8–2
|- align="center" bgcolor="#ffcccc"
| 31 || May 30 || Miami (OH) || Varsity Diamond • Columbus, Ohio || 3–4 || 19–12 || 8–2
|-

|- align="center" bgcolor="#ccffcc"
| 32 || June 1 || at  || Old College Field • East Lansing, Michigan || 8–0 || 20–12 || 9–2
|- align="center" bgcolor="#ccffcc"
| 33 || June 2 || at Michigan State || Old College Field • East Lansing, Michigan || 9–8 || 21–12 || 10–2
|-

|-
|-
! style="" | Postseason
|- valign="top"

|- align="center" bgcolor="#ccffcc"
| 34 || June 8 || Western Michigan || Varsity Diamond • Columbus, Ohio || 1–0 || 22–12 || 10–2
|- align="center" bgcolor="#ffcccc"
| 35 || June 8 || Western Michigan || Varsity Diamond • Columbus, Ohio || 2–4 || 22–13 || 10–2
|- align="center" bgcolor="#ccffcc"
| 36 || June 9 || Western Michigan || Varsity Diamond • Columbus, Ohio || 3–2 || 23–13 || 10–2
|-

|- align="center" bgcolor="#ffcccc"
| 37 || June 13 || Oklahoma || Omaha Municipal Stadium • Omaha, Nebraska || 8–9 || 23–14 || 10–2
|- align="center" bgcolor="#ffcccc"
| 38 || June 13 || Texas A&M || Omaha Municipal Stadium • Omaha, Nebraska || 2–3 || 23–15 || 10–2
|-

Awards and honors 
Dick Hauck
 First Team All-Big Ten

Stewart Hein
 First Team All-Big Ten

References 

Ohio State Buckeyes baseball seasons
Ohio State Buckeyes baseball
Big Ten Conference baseball champion seasons
Ohio State
College World Series seasons